Mir Majedur Rahman is a Jatiya Party (Ershad) politician and the former Member of Parliament of Tangail-5.

Career
Rahman was elected to parliament from Tangail-5 as a Jatiya Party candidate in 1988.

References

Jatiya Party politicians
Living people
3rd Jatiya Sangsad members
Year of birth missing (living people)